The Abbey of San Fruttuoso is on the Italian Riviera between Camogli and Portofino. It is the seat of the Catholic parish of the same name of the Vicariate of Recco-Uscio-Camogli, Archdiocese of Genoa.

The abbey is located in a small bay beneath a steep wooded hill. It can only be reached by sea or by hiking trails, there is no road access.

St Fructuosus
The abbey is dedicated to Saint Fructuosus, a third-century bishop of Tarraco (now Tarragona in north-east Spain) who was martyred under the persecutions of the Roman Emperor Valerian. In the eighth century the relics of Fructuosus were moved here by Greek monks. St Fructuosus's ashes are still kept at the abbey.

History

The abbey was founded by the Order of Saint Benedict and most of its buildings date to the tenth and eleventh centuries. The original tenth-century church tower had a Byzantine-style spherical top; this was later replaced by the present octagonal tower. The cloisters are twelfth century and were modified in the sixteenth century by Andrea Doria. The building facing the sea was built in the thirteenth century to a similar design to the noble palaces of Genoa.

The abbey contains tombs of members of the noble Genoan Doria family dating from 1275 to 1305, along with other tombs and an ancient Roman sarcophagus. The Doria tombs have black and white stripes, typical of Ligurian architecture of the period.

Above the abbey stands Torre Doria, a watchtower erected in 1562 by the family of Admiral Andrea Doria (1466–1560), who defended the abbey and its supply of fresh water from Barbary pirates.

In the 17th century the abbey went into decline, and parts of it were used for keeping sheep. In 1730 Camillo Doria restored the abbey, and returned the church to liturgical use. Some of the buildings were damaged by flooding in 1915, these were restored by the Italian state in 1933. In 1983 the Doria Pamphili family donated the San Fruttuoso complex to the heritage organisation Fondo Ambiente Italiano. Restoration of the buildings started in 1985 and was completed in 2017.

In literature

San Fruttuoso was visited by Finnish writer Göran Schildt in his documented travels on board the ketch Daphne in 1948.

See also
 Castello Brown

References

External links
 Website on the abbey and its surroundings

Monasteries in Liguria
Benedictine monasteries in Italy
Churches in the province of Genoa
Romanesque architecture in Liguria
Fondo Ambiente Italiano